Huangyangchuan is a village situated in Gu Lang Gorgean, an arid, mountainous region of Gansu Province, China. It is home mostly to poor families who rely on agriculture for their income.

Film
Yellow Sheep River is also the name of a film about sheep farmers from the village.  The documentary is without dialogue or subtitles, and follows the farmers to provide a picturesque view of rural life.

References

Geography of Gansu
Township-level divisions of Gansu